Jackson is an unincorporated community in Columbia County, in the U.S. state of Washington.

The community bears the name of an early settler.

References

Unincorporated communities in Columbia County, Washington
Unincorporated communities in Washington (state)